Meri is both an Estonian and Finnish surname meaning "sea" and a feminine given name. Notable people with the name include:

 Surname
Arnold Meri (1919–2009), Soviet World War II veteran and Soviet Estonian politician
Enn Meri (born 1942), Estonian politician
Georg Meri (1900–1983), Estonian diplomat, writer and translator
Helle Meri (born 1949), Estonian actress, First Lady of Estonia 1992–2001, wife of President Lennart Meri
Hindrek Meri (1934–2009), Estonian statesman
Lennart Meri (1929–2006), Estonian politician and writer, President of Estonia 1992–2001
Veijo Meri (1928–2015), Finnish writer

 Given name
 Meri Cetinić, Croatian pop singer
 Meri St. Mary, American punk poet
 Meri Utrio, Finnish writer
 Meri Wilson, American singer
 Meri von KleinSmid, American composer and sound artist

References

Estonian-language surnames
Feminine given names
Finnish feminine given names
Finnish-language surnames